Ganmain is a town in the Riverina region of New South Wales, Australia. Ganmain is in the Coolamon Shire local government area and had a population at the 2016 census of 779.

History
The town name is said to be an Aboriginal word meaning "Crown scenes on the Moon for tribal reasons" or "native decorated with scars".

Ganmain takes its name from Ganmain Run, a cattle station established in 1838, by settler James Devlin.

Boggy Creek Post Office opened on 10 December 1888, was renamed Derry in 1894 and Ganmain later the same year.

In 1973, the Ganmain Historical Society was opened by six local families.

Today
Ganmain is the self-proclaimed "Sheaf Hay centre of Australia" and has produced chaff for many leading racehorse trainers in Australia.  The Big Haystack in Pioneer Park reflects this background.

The town has two primary schools, Ganmain Public School and St. Brendan's Catholic Primary School.

Australian rules football is the most popular sport with the local team, Ganmain-Grong Grong-Matong playing in the Riverina Football Netball League.

Sport
The most popular sport in Ganmain is Australian rules football, as it lies in the narrow 'canola belt', a geographical triangle stretching from Grong Grong and Marrar, New South Wales at either end of the Canola Way, to Ungarie, in which Australian football retains a strong following, despite New South Wales being a largely rugby league supporting state. The town's team competes in the Riverina Football League.

Notable people from Ganmain
 Former Catholic Archbishop of the Roman Catholic Archdiocese of Canberra and Goulburn, Francis Carroll.
 Former Sydney Swans Australian rules footballer, Dennis Carroll and North Melbourne's Frank Gumbleton.

External links

Travelmate  - Ganmain.  Tourist information site.
Coolamon Shire Council - Official website.  Ganmain page.

References

Towns in the Riverina
Coolamon Shire